Sir Charles Matthew Farrer  (born 3 December 1929) was private solicitor to the Queen Elizabeth II from 1965 to 1994. He was a senior partner with Farrer & Co. He is the son of Sir Leslie Farrer and the Honourable Lady Farrer.

He was educated at Bryanston School and Balliol College, Oxford. He was appointed Knight Commander of the Royal Victorian Order in 1983. He was appointed Knight Grand Cross in December 1994. 	

He was President of the Selden Society from 2001 to 2003.

References

External links
Profile, debretts.com

1929 births
Living people
People educated at Bryanston School
Alumni of Balliol College, Oxford
Knights Grand Cross of the Royal Victorian Order